A folding screen, also known as pingfeng, is a type of free-standing furniture consisting of several frames or panels, which are often connected by hinges or by other means. They have practical and decorative uses, and can be made in a variety of designs with different kinds of materials. Folding screens originated from ancient China, eventually spreading to the rest of East Asia, and were popular amongst Europeans.

History

Origin

Screens date back to China during the Eastern Zhou period (771–256 BCE). These were initially one-panel screens in contrast to folding screens. Folding screens were invented during the Han dynasty (206 BCE – 220 CE). Depictions of those folding screens have been found in Han-era tombs, such as one in Zhucheng, Shandong Province.

A folding screen was often decorated with beautiful art; major themes included mythology, scenes of palace life, and nature. It is often associated with intrigue and romance in Chinese literature, for example, a young lady in love could take a curious peek hidden from behind a folding screen. An example of such a thematic occurrence of the folding screen is in the classical novel Dream of the Red Chamber by Cao Xueqin. The folding screen was a recurring element in Tang literature. The Tang poet Li He (790–816) wrote the "Song of the Screen", describing a folding screen of a newly-wed couple. The folding screen surrounded the bed of the young couple, its twelve panels were adorned with butterflies alighted on China pink flowers (an allusion to lovers), and had silver hinges resembling glass coins.

Folding screens were originally made from wooden panels and painted on lacquered surfaces, eventually folding screens made from paper or silk became popular too. Even though folding screens were known to have been used since antiquity, it became rapidly popular during the Tang dynasty (618–907). During the Tang dynasty, folding screens were considered ideal ornaments for many painters to display their paintings and calligraphy on. Many artists painted on paper or silk and applied it onto the folding screen. There were two distinct artistic folding screens mentioned in historical literature of the era. One of it was known as the huaping and the other was known as the shuping. It was not uncommon for people to commission folding screens from artists, such as from Tang-era painter Cao Ba or Song-era painter Guo Xi. The landscape paintings on folding screens reached its height during the Song dynasty (960–1279). The lacquer techniques for the Coromandel screens, which is known as kuancai ( "incised colors"), emerged during the late Ming dynasty (1368-1644) and was applied to folding screens to create dark screens incised, painted, and inlaid with art of mother-of-pearl, ivory, or other materials.

Spread throughout East Asia

Korea 

The byeongpung (Korean: 병풍; "Folding screen") became significant during the period of Unified Silla (668–935). The most common uses for byeongpung were as decoration, as room dividers, or to block wind caused by draft from the Ondol heated floors which were common across Korea. Commonly depicted on Korean folding screens were paintings of landscapes as well as flowers and artistic renditions of calligraphy. Prominent byeongpung screens known as irworobongdo were important elements in the throne room of some Joseon kings, placed immediately behind the throne. Several examples of irworobongdo can be seen across palaces in Korea such as at Gyeongbok Palace, Changdeok Palace and Changgyeonggung.

Common types of byeongpung produced during the Joseon dynasty included:

 Chimbyeong (침병): A folding screen placed by the bedside.
 Baeknapbyeong (백납병): A folding screen decorated with drawings or writings on various subjects.
 Jangsaengdobyeong (장생도병): A folding screen depicting the "Shipjangsaengdo" (10 symbols of longevity)
 Sinseondobyeong (신선도병): A folding screen depicting the gods under the influence of Taoist thought.
 Sobyeong (소병): A folding screen used for mourning or ancestral rites, with only white paper on without any drawings.

Japan 

A Japanese folding screen (or byōbu) originated from the Han Dynasty of China and is thought to have been imported to Japan in the 7th or 8th century. The oldest byōbu produced in Japan is Torige ritsujo no byōbu (鳥毛立女屏風) from the 8th century, and it is stored in Shōsōin Treasure Repository. from the Heian period in the 9th century, due to the development of Japan's original Kokufū Bunka (国風文化), the designs became more indigenous and came to be used as furnishings in the architectural style of Shinden-zukuri.

The characteristic of folding screens in the Muromachi period was the spatial expression of silence, but in the Azuchi-Momoyama period, when daimyo (feudal lords) competed for supremacy, folding screens with paintings of tigers and dragons became popular. In the Edo period, as the economy developed, emerging merchants became patrons in the production of folding screens. In this period, the Rinpa school folding screens were popular, which were characterized by highly decorative designs using gold or silver foil, bold compositions depicting simple objects, and repeated patterns.

Spread to Europe
Folding screens were introduced in the late Middle Ages to Europe. In the 17th and 18th centuries, many folding screens were imported from China to Europe. Europeans and especially the French had admiration and desire for the Chinese folding screens, and began importing large lacquered folding screens adorned with art. The French fashion designer Coco Chanel was an avid collector of Chinese folding screens and is believed to have owned 32 folding screens, of which eight were housed in her apartment at 31 rue Cambon, Paris. She once said:

Uses 
Although folding screens originated in China, they can now be found in many interior designs throughout the world. Some of the first uses of folding screens were rather practical. They were used to prevent draft in homes, as indicated by the two characters in their Chinese name: ping ( "screen; blocking") and feng ( "breeze, wind"). They were also used to bestow a sense of privacy; in classical times, folding screens were often placed in rooms to be used as dressing screens for ladies. Folding screens can be set up to partition a large room and change the interior features of the space. Screens may be used as a false wall near the entrance from one room to another to create a desirable atmosphere by hiding certain features like doors to a kitchen. As many folding screens have fine artistic designs and art on them, they can fit well as decorative items in the interior design of a home.

See also

 Room divider
 Chinoiserie
 Coromandel screen
 Hanging scroll
 Rood screen and triptych: panels in churches
 Shower

References

Folding screens
Chinese calligraphy
Chinese inventions
Chinese painting
Decorative arts
Screens (partitions)